Alvin James Baldus (April 27, 1926 – February 2, 2017) was an American Democratic politician who served as a member of Congress for Wisconsin from 1975 to 1981 as well as two tenures as a member of the Wisconsin State Assembly (1966–1975 and 1989–1997).

Early and career
Born in Garner, Iowa, Baldus graduated from high school in Elkton, Minnesota and went to Riverland Community College (formerly Austin Junior College) in Austin, Minnesota.

He was in the United States Merchant Marine from 1944 to 1946 and the United States Army, serving in the Korean War from 1951 to 1953.

In 1959, he wed Lorayne Reiten, to whom he would be married until his death in 2017.

He served in the Wisconsin State Assembly from 1966 to 1975 and again from 1989 to 1997.

Congress
He served three terms in the United States House of Representatives from 1975 to 1981, representing Wisconsin's 3rd congressional district—the first Democrat to hold this seat in 66 years. He served as part of the 94th, 95th and 96th United States Congresses.

He ran unsuccessfully for reelection in 1980, losing to Republican Steve Gunderson.

Death
He died at his home in Menomonie, Wisconsin. He was buried at St Joseph's Catholic Church Cemetery.

Notes

External links

1926 births
2017 deaths
People from Garner, Iowa
People from Prescott, Wisconsin
Military personnel from Wisconsin
United States Merchant Mariners of World War II
Democratic Party members of the United States House of Representatives from Wisconsin
People from Menomonie, Wisconsin
United States Army personnel of the Korean War
Democratic Party members of the Wisconsin State Assembly